Andrea Woodner is an American artist, architect, and philanthropist. She is the founder of the New York City-based Design Trust for Public Space, a nonprofit organization which "brings together government agencies, community groups, and private-sector experts to transform and evolve the city's landscape."

Early life 
Andrea Woodner is the daughter of Ruth Lyon and Ian Woodner. She has two siblings, Dian and Jonathan Woodner.

Woodner was raised in New York City and loved art from an early age, often visiting the Frick Collection during her teenage years. She earned a BA with a concentration in ceramics and sculpture from Bennington College in the class of 1970. Later, she took classes at the Harvard University Graduate School of Design, then earned a master's in architecture from the Columbia University Graduate School of Architecture, Planning, and Preservation.

Career 
In 1995, Woodner founded the nonprofit organization Design Trust for Public Space to connect design thought and incubation to the public good of New York City. She chaired the organization's board of directors until January 2016, when she was succeeded by Eric Rothman. She continues to be active in fundraising for Design Trust.

Upon their father's death in November 1990, Andrea and Dian Woodner inherited the Ian Woodner Family Collection. In 1991, the Woodner sisters variously sold and donated 143 works of art from his collection to the National Gallery of Art in Washington, DC, including drawings by Albrecht Dürer, Benvenuto Cellini, and Giorgio Vasari. In July 2000, the sisters donated nearly 100 works of art by Odilon Redon to the Museum of Modern Art, including paintings, pastels, watercolors, drawings, prints and illustrated books.

Woodner's art has been exhibited at the Palmer Gallery of Vassar College.

References 

Living people
20th-century American women artists
American women architects
Year of birth missing (living people)
Bennington College alumni
Harvard Graduate School of Design alumni
Columbia Graduate School of Architecture, Planning and Preservation alumni
American women philanthropists
20th-century American philanthropists
20th-century American artists
Architects from New York City
Artists from New York City
Philanthropists from New York (state)
21st-century American women
20th-century women philanthropists